Johnathan Reginald Davis (born 1991) is a member for the Tuggeranong seat of Brindabella, elected to the Australian Capital Territory Legislative Assembly in 2020. He is the ACT Green's spokesperson for Education, Health, Drug Harm Reduction, Business & the Night Time Economy, LGBTIQA+ Affairs, Sport and Recreation, Tourism and Events, Young People and the Elimination of Family & Domestic Violence. 

Prior to his election, Davis studied politics and policy at the University of Canberra, and worked as a real estate agent. He first ran for office at the 2012 ACT election at the age of 20; he also ran in the 2016 ACT election and at the 2019 federal election for the seat of Bean.

At the 2020 Australian Capital Territory general election Davis won one of the five seats in Brindabella.

References 

Living people
Members of the Australian Capital Territory Legislative Assembly
Australian Greens members of the Australian Capital Territory Legislative Assembly
21st-century Australian politicians
1991 births